Pavol Staňo (born 29 September 1977) is a Slovak professional football manager and former player, who is currently in charge of Ekstraklasa side Wisła Płock.

Honours
Artmedia Petržalka
 Pribina Cup: 2005

Jagiellonia Białystok
 Polish Cup: 2009–10

Club career
Staňo previously played for FC Spartak Trnava and FC Artmedia Petržalka in the Slovak Corgoň Liga.

References

External links 
 

1977 births
Living people
People from Čadca District
Sportspeople from the Žilina Region
Slovak footballers
Slovak football managers
Slovak expatriate footballers
Association football defenders
FC Spartak Trnava players
FC Petržalka players
Polonia Bytom players
Jagiellonia Białystok players
Korona Kielce players
Bruk-Bet Termalica Nieciecza players
Slovak Super Liga players
Ekstraklasa players
Slovak expatriate sportspeople in Poland
Expatriate footballers in Poland
Podbeskidzie Bielsko-Biała players
Slovak Super Liga managers
Ekstraklasa managers
MŠK Žilina managers
Wisła Płock managers
Expatriate football managers in Poland